Ágnes Szávay and Vladimíra Uhlířová were the defending champions, but chose not to participate.

Alizé Cornet and Janette Husárová won the tournament, defeating Vanessa Henke and Raluca Olaru in the final, 6–7(5–7), 6–1, [10–6].

Seeds

Draw

External links 
 Draw

2008 Doubles
Budapest Grand Prix - Doubles